Martín Lapeña Ramos (born 11 March 2000) is a Spanish professional footballer who plays for UD Logroñés as an attacking midfielder.

Club career
Born in Agullent, Valencian Community, Lapeña was a Valencia CF youth graduate. In 2019, after finishing his formation, he moved to UD Logroñés and was assigned to the reserves in Tercera División.

Lapeña made his senior debut on 24 August 2019, starting in a 1–1 away draw against Comillas CF. He scored his first senior goals on 28 September, netting four times in a 6–1 home routing of CD Pradejón, and finished the campaign with 14 goals in 27 appearances.

Lapeña made his first-team debut on 3 October 2020, coming on as a late substitute for Zelu in a 1–2 away loss against UD Las Palmas in the Segunda División.

References

External links

2000 births
Living people
People from Vall d'Albaida
Sportspeople from the Province of Valencia
Spanish footballers
Footballers from the Valencian Community
Association football midfielders
Segunda División players
Tercera División players
UD Logroñés B players
UD Logroñés players